Stephanie Bennett is a harpist, composer, arranger and vocalist who lives in Los Angeles. She plays popular music, jazz, and other contemporary music genres.

Career
Bennett began studying the harp as a junior high school student in Ann Arbor, Michigan, after having studied some guitar and piano as a child. She continued her studies of classical harp performance with Ruth Dean Clark at the University of Michigan, where she also studied composition with Pulitzer Prize winning composer Leslie Bassett and Ross Lee Finney. While in college, she also began exploring creating her own arrangements of popular music.  She continued her music studies at the Dick Grove School of Music and at UCLA Extension, with courses in Advanced Modern Harmony (including jazz and pop music harmony), Arranging, Twentieth Century Harmony, Film Scoring, etc.

Bennett has performed in the United States, Japan, Australia, Brazil, Argentina, Chile, Ecuador, Guatemala, Costa Rica, Uruguay, Panama, France and Switzerland, including solo harp performances of her own compositions at the Montreux Jazz Festival (Switzerland), as a guest artist at the International Music Seminars in Montpelier, France, and at the International Conference on Women in Music. She has performed for President Obama, the President of Israel, and the President of Ireland.

For the winter 1984 concert season, Bennett joined the American folk-music group The New Christy Minstrels, playing harp in a U.S. tour booked by Community Concerts, a division of Columbia Artists Management Inc. Later in 1984, she toured as part of the band of R&B artist Bobby Womack, along with frequent guest artist Sly Stone.

In 1989, she gave a solo harp performance at the Montreux Jazz Festival in Switzerland.

In 1999, she was invited by the Los Angeles World Affairs Council to perform Irish music for the President of Ireland upon the president's visit to Los Angeles.

Bennett lives in the Los Angeles area, where she composes, records and produces her own CDs, composes and produces music that has been heard on television shows such as Bones, Murphy Brown, Party of Five and The Single Guy, and on the feature film A Time For Dancing. She writes musical arrangements for other artists (including arrangements for rocker Ozzy Osbourne, Native American flute player Golana, Celtic fiddler Mary Barton, and New Age ensemble Midnight Skye). She composes chamber music which has been performed by ensembles such as "Entr'amis" (classical harp, flute and viola trio), and "Campanile", (renowned contemporary handbell ensemble).

Bennett plays harp on soundtracks for movies and television, and plays harp on recordings by many other artists (including the Dixie Chicks, Sir Paul McCartney, LeAnn Rimes, Lamb, Linda Ronstadt, Everlast, Good Charlotte, Miyuki Nakajima, and Ray Conniff),teaches harp students, and writes lyrics which have been recorded by other vocalists, as well as writing music for other vocalists. She has toured with groups as diverse as R&B legend Bobby Womack, big band Ray Conniff Singers & Orchestra, Persian singing star Dariush, Mexican superstars Vicente & Alejandro Fernandez, and Canadian band Cowboy Celtic.

Bennett has also appeared onscreen in television, movies and music videos, including American Idol, The Sweetest Thing with Cameron Diaz, Celine Dion's 1998 Christmas special, 1999 hit movie The Other Sister (with Diane Keaton, Juliette Lewis and Giovanni Ribisi); Love Affair with Warren Beatty, Gypsy with Bette Midler, Cobb with Tommy Lee Jones, the Frank Sinatra mini-series, A Romantic Christmas by John Tesh, music videos including Trisha Yearwood and Aerosmith, and television shows including Bones, Murphy Brown, Falcon Crest, Sisters, and Picket Fences.

Bennett was part of American balladeer group the Bards of FoDLA and produced their album Sacred Oaks (2012) through Harpworld Music Co.

Honors

In 1979, Stephanie Bennett won first prize in the Second Salvi International Competition of Jazz and Pop Harp. The Hollywood Reporter has called her "one of our country's top harpists".

Discography

References

External links
Official website

Living people
American harpists
Year of birth missing (living people)
University of Michigan School of Music, Theatre & Dance alumni
University of California, Los Angeles alumni
Musicians from Los Angeles
Musicians from Ann Arbor, Michigan
The New Christy Minstrels members